Dhaliwal may refer to;

Villages in Punjab, India

Dhaliwal, Nakodar, Jalandhar district
Dhaliwal Bet, Kapurthala district
Dhaliwal Dona, Kapurthala district
Mand Dhaliwal, Kapurthala district

Other uses
Dhaliwal (surname)